Lasiodiscus mildbraedii is small tree in the family Rhamnaceae. It occurs locally along the African east coast from South Africa northwards and in the African tropics. It is sometimes a dominant component of tropical forest understorey. Groups of small pale flowers are carried on long stalks in spring. The fruits reach maturity at the end of summer. The leaves have an opposite arrangement as in all members of Lasiodiscus. The leaf texture is somewhat rough and leathery. Leaf undersides are somewhat rufous toned.

References

 Trees of Southern Africa, K C Palgrave, 1984  

mildbraedii
Flora of Africa
Trees of South Africa